Elizabeth Hawley (9 November 1923 – 26 January 2018) was an American journalist, author, and chronicler of Himalayan mountaineering expeditions.  Hawley's The Himalayan Database became the unofficial record for climbs in the Nepalese Himalaya.  She was also the honorary consul in Nepal for New Zealand.

Biography

Early life
Hawley was born in Chicago, Illinois in 1923.  She was educated at the University of Michigan and graduated with an honours degree in English in 1946. Having visited Kathmandu on a round-the-world trip in 1957, Hawley moved to Nepal full-time in 1959, giving up her job as a researcher for Fortune magazine in New York.  In 1960 she started as a journalist and correspondent for Time,  but later moved to the Reuters news agency in 1962. She covered the 1963 American Everest expedition that traversed Mount Everest. Her article on the death of the Nepalese prime minister made the front page of The New York Times.  She socialized regularly with royalty and senior politicians in Nepal, on whom she reported for US media.

Climbing database
While she never climbed a mountain herself, Hawley was the best-known chronicler of Nepalese Himalayan expeditions from the 1960s onwards (she did not chronicle the Karakoram Himalaya such as K2 or Nanga Parbat), and was respected by the international mountaineering community because of the accuracy of her records, and the tenacity of her investigations; winning her the nickname "The Sherlock Holmes of the Mountaineering World".  Italian climber Reinhold Messner told Outside, "If I need information about climbing 8,000-meter peaks, I go to her".  Sir Edmund Hillary, one of her closest friends (she was an Executive Officer for Hillary's Himalayan Trust), once called her "a bit of a terror".

Hawley's detailed mountaineering records are summarized in The Himalayan Database, and have been used both as a record of successful ascents, and also of establishing success rates and fatality rates, for climbers in the Nepal Himalaya.  Having a Himalayan ascent logged on Hawley's database became an essential requirement for  mountaineers, which lead to many famous disputes, including:

Awards and honours
In 2008, French ice climber François Damilano named a peak in Nepal after Elizabeth Hawley having made a solo first ascent of Peak Hawley (6,182 meters) in the Dhaulagiri Group on 9 May 2008.  In 2014, the Nepalese State officially confirmed the naming of Peak Hawley.

She was the  honorary consul in Nepal for New Zealand for 20 years up until her retirement in 2010, for which she received the Queen's Service Medal in 2004. She was also awarded the Swiss King Albert I Memorial Foundation Medal in 1998 for services to mountaineering, and was the first recipient of the Sagarmatha National Award from the Government of Nepal.  The former American ambassador to Nepal, Peter Bodde, described Hawley as one of Nepal's "living treasures" and that "her contribution to the depth of knowledge and understanding between Nepal and the US was immense".

Bibliography

Filmography

See also
Eight-thousanders
The Himalayan Database
Himalayan Trust

References

External links

Biography of Elizabeth Hawley (1923 – 2018), American Alpine Club (13 February 2018)
"The High Priestess of Posterity", Outside (2011)
Elizabeth Hawley (1998), King Albert I Memorial Foundation Medal 
The legacy of Elizabeth Hawley, Lonely Planet (2018)

1923 births
2018 deaths
People from Chicago
Journalists from Illinois
American women journalists
Historians of mountaineering
University of Michigan College of Literature, Science, and the Arts alumni
Recipients of the Queen's Service Medal
Honorary consuls
Reuters people
21st-century American women